William John Seifert (born July 2, 1939 - Skyland, North Carolina) is a retired NASCAR Sprint Cup Series who raced from 1966 to 1979.

Career
His grand total for race winnings is $147,831 USD ($ when adjusted for inflation). Seifert's average career start is 21st and his average career finish is 19th. Bill Seifert was also a NASCAR owner from 1966 to 1973, providing rides to notable drivers like Cale Yarborough, LeeRoy Yarbrough, and Cecil Gordon. The Seifert-owned vehicles managed to gain eight finishes in the top five and seventy-one finishes in the top ten. Total earnings for all the vehicles owned by Bill Seifert were $467,360 USD ($ in when adjusted for inflation) after racing ; which is the equivalent of 65,738 laps.

References

1939 births
Living people
NASCAR drivers
NASCAR team owners
People from Buncombe County, North Carolina
Racing drivers from North Carolina